The Penrhos Feilw Standing Stones are a pair of standing stones on Holy Island west of Anglesey in north-west Wales. They are thought to date from the Bronze Age but their origins and purpose are unclear.

Stones
Little is known about the history of the stones. They are believed to be between 3,500 and 4,000 years old and are a Scheduled ancient monument. They are aligned along their long axes in a northeasterly/southwesterly direction, with a fine view of the coast and towards Holyhead Mountain. There are theories that they may have formed part of a stone circle, however there is no evidence to support this. It is also said that there was previously a stone cist between them, but again this story lacks supporting evidence. There may be some significance to the fact that they are located just  from the Plas Meilw hut circle but their presence here is "quite enigmatic".

Access
The stones are in the care of Cadw; the site is open to the public throughout the year, except around Christmas and the New Year, free of charge. Access is through a kissing gate and across a grassy field, and there is a pull-in by the roadside, large enough for a single car.

References

Scheduled monuments in Anglesey
History of Anglesey
Megalithic monuments in Wales